The 1937 college football season ended with the Panthers of the University of Pittsburgh being named the nation's No. 1 team (and "mythical national champion") by 30 of the 33 voters in the Associated Press writers' poll.  The AP poll was in its second year, and seven votes were taken during the final weeks of the 1937 season, starting with October 18. Each writer listed his choice for the top ten teams, and points were tallied based on 10 for first place, 9 for second, etc., and the AP then ranked the twenty teams with the highest number of points.  With 33 writers polled, Pitt received 30 first place votes and 3 second-place, for a total of 327 points.

The NCAA began keeping official game statistics in 1937.

Conference and program changes

September
September 25 The defending champion Minnesota Gophers opened their season with a 69–7 win over visiting North Dakota State.  LSU beat Florida, 19–0.  Alabama beat Samford 41–0.  California won 30–7 over St. Mary's.  In Seattle, Washington beat Iowa, 14–0.  The day before, Pittsburgh had opened with a 59–0 win over Ohio Wesleyan.

October
October 2 Minnesota lost at Nebraska, 14–9.  LSU defeated Texas 9–0.  Pittsburgh won at West Virginia, 20–0.  In Birmingham, Alabama beat Sewanee, 65–0.  In Los Angeles, Washington defeated USC, 7–0.  California beat Oregon State, 24–6.  Yale beat Maine, 26–0.

October 9 In Houston, LSU defeated Rice, 13–0.  Pittsburgh beat its cross-town rival, Duquesne, 6–0.  Alabama beat South Carolina, 20–0.  All three teams had held their opposition scoreless.  California defeated Washington State 27–0.  Washington lost to Oregon State, 6–3.  Yale beat Penn, 27–7.  Minnesota recovered from its Nebraska loss to beat Indiana 6–0.

October 16 
LSU registered its fourth shutout in four starts, a 13–0 win over Ole Miss.  Pittsburgh and Fordham played to a 0–0 tie in New York.
Alabama yielded its first points, but won at Tennessee, 14–7.  California beat the California Aggies (later UC-Davis) 14–0 and Pacific, 20–0, in a doubleheader.  Yale defeated Army, 15–7.  Minnesota won at Michigan, 39–6.  In the first poll taken, California was No. 1, followed by Alabama, Pittsburgh, Minnesota, and Yale.  LSU, despite a 54–0 scoring edge over its opposition, was sixth.

October 23 
No. 1 California beat No. 11 USC 20–6.  In Washington, No. 2 Alabama defeated GWU, 19–0.  No. 3 Pittsburgh won at No. 16 Wisconsin 26–6.  No. 4 Minnesota was idle.  No. 5 Yale beat No. 19  Cornell, 9–0. The next top five was No. 1 California, No. 2 Pittsburgh, No. 3 Alabama, No. 4 Minnesota, and No. 5 Yale

October 30 In Los Angeles, No. 1 California defeated UCLA 27–14, while in Pittsburgh, the No. 2 Pitt Panthers beat Carnegie Tech, 25–14.  No. 3 Alabama beat Kentucky, 41–0.  No. 4 Minnesota lost to Notre Dame, 7–6, and No. 5 Yale and No. 9 Dartmouth played to a 9–9 tie.  No. 6 Baylor, which reached 6–0–0 with a 6–0 win over TCU, and No. 10 Fordham, which won at No. 15 North Carolina, 14–0, moved up to fourth and fifth place in the next Top Five, behind California, Alabama, and Pittsburgh.

November
November 6 No. 1 California and Washington played to a 0–0 tie.  In New Orleans, No. 2 Alabama beat No. 19 Tulane, 9–6.  No. 3 Pittsburgh won at No. 12 Notre Dame, 21–6 to take the top spot in the next poll.  No. 4 Baylor lost to unranked Texas, 9–6.  No. 5 Fordham beat Purdue, 21–3.  No. 9 Dartmouth, which beat Princeton 33–9, reached the next Top Five: No. 1 Pittsburgh, No. 2 California, No. 3 Alabama, No. 4 Fordham, and No. 5 Dartmouth.

November 13 No. 1 Pittsburgh defeated visiting No. 11 Nebraska, 13–7.  In Portland, No. 2 California beat Oregon, 26–0.  In Birmingham, No. 3 Alabama beat Georgia Tech, 7–0.  No. 4 Fordham was idle.  No. 5 Dartmouth and Cornell played to a 6–6 tie.  No. 6 Yale returned to the Top Five with a 26–0 win over Princeton, ranking fifth behind Pittsburgh, California, Alabama, and Fordham.

November 20 No. 1 Pittsburgh beat Penn State, 28–7.  No. 2 California won at No. 13 Stanford, 13–0, to finish at 9–0–1.  No. 3 Alabama was idle.  No. 4 Fordham beat St. Mary's, 6–0.  No. 5 Yale lost its final game of the season, 13–6, at Harvard.  No. 7 Minnesota closed its season with a 13–6 win over Wisconsin and moved up to fifth place behind Pittsburgh, California, Fordham, and Alabama.

On Thanksgiving Day, No. 4 Alabama beat No. 12 Vanderbilt 9–7 in Nashville.  Then, on November 27 
No. 1 Pittsburgh closed its season unbeaten (8–0–1) with a 10–0 win at No. 18 Duke. No. 3 Fordham closed its season unbeaten (7–0–1) with a 20–7 win over NYU at Yankee Stadium.  No. 2 California and No. 5 Minnesota had completed their seasons, and the top five remained unchanged from the previous week.

Conference standings

Major conference standings

Independents

Minor conferences

Minor conference standings

Awards and honors

All-Americans

The consensus All-America team included:

Individual leaders
 Rushing yards (total): Byron White, Colorado, 1,121 yards
 Rushing yards (per carry): Dick Cassiano, Pittsburgh, 9.0 yards/carry 
 Passing yards (total): Billy Patterson, Baylor, 1,109 yards 
 Receiving yards (total): Jim Benton, Arkansas, 814 yards
 Points scored: Byron White, Colorado, 122 points
 Punting: Johnny Pingel, Michigan State, 42.9 yards/punt

Heisman Trophy voting
The Heisman Trophy is given to the year's most outstanding player

Rankings

Bowl games

See also
1937 College Football All-America Team

References